The 2001 South Africa rugby union tour of Europe and USA was a series of matches played in November–December 2001 in Europe and USA by South Africa national rugby union team.
At the same time the "A" national team also toured Europe.

Springboks tour
Scores and results list South Africa's points tally first.

"A" team tour 
'Scores and results list South Africa's points tally first.

Note

2001 rugby union tours
tour
2001
2001 
2001–02 in European rugby union
2001–02 in French rugby union
2001–02 in Italian rugby union
2001–02 in English rugby union
2001–02 in Spanish rugby union
2001 in American rugby union
Rugby union tours of France
Rugby union tours of Spain
Rugby union tours of Georgia (country)
Rugby union tours of Italy
Rugby union tours of England
2001